Debra L. Lee (born August 8, 1954) is an American businesswoman. She was the Chairman and Chief Executive Officer of BET, the parent company for Black Entertainment Television from 2005 to May 28, 2018. Lee has sat on the board of directors for a number of companies/organizations, including the National Cable & Telecommunications Association the Ad Council, and the National Cable Television Association. Debra Lee is named one of the "100 Most Powerful Women in Entertainment" by The Hollywood Reporter due to her many achievements in her 30-plus year career at BET.

Early life and education
Debra L. Lee was born in Fort Jackson, South Carolina and grew up in Greensboro, North Carolina. She attended James B. Dudley High School. In 1976, Lee graduated from Brown University with a bachelor's degree in political science with an emphasis in Asian politics. She went on to earn a master's degree in public policy from Harvard University's John F. Kennedy School of Government and a J.D. degree at Harvard Law School, where she was a member of the Board of Student Advisers, in 1980.

Early career 
From August 1981 through September 1981, Lee served as a law clerk to Barrington Parker of the U.S. District Court for the District of Columbia.

Lee joined BET as Vice President of BET's legal affairs department and general counsel in 1986 after over five years as an attorney with Washington, D.C. based Steptoe & Johnson, a corporate law firm. She has also served as BET's corporate secretary and president and publisher of BET's publishing division, which published Emerge magazine, YSB magazine, BET Weekend, and Heart & Soul magazine.

Career 

In March 1996, Lee became president and Chief Operating Officer (COO) of BET Holdings, Inc., replacing departing network founder, Robert L. Johnson. In 2005, she became president and Chief Executive Officer (CEO). The company had nearly $100 million in revenue last year.

Under Lee, Black Entertainment Television has begun to move in a different format direction for the network. She increased the production budget by 50% and looked into incorporating original programming by getting 16 new shows for the new 2007 season. Lee has also redesigned BET's mission statement by supporting families, encouraging their dreams, and presenting fresh talent by creating new shows for its network. She created a new entertainment network, CENTRIC, in September 2009 that features new artists, reality shows, and movies.

In 2023 her memories under the title I am Debra Lee were published by Legacy Lit.

Directorships 
Lee serves on board of directors  of Marriott, and Revlon.  Lee is also a director of Washington Gas Light Company,  WGL Holdings (since 2000) and the Monsanto subsidiary Genuity. In May 2016, Lee was added to the board of directors of Twitter, following an attempt by returning CEO Jack Dorsey to boost diversity across the social media company's board.

Awards and honors
 Broadcasting and Cable Hall of Fame
 2002: Women of Vision Award by Women in Film & Video - DC
 2014: Received an honorary Doctorate of Humane Letters from Brown University.

References

External links
BET
NYT Article: At BET, Fighting the Rerun

1955 births
20th-century American businesspeople
20th-century American businesswomen
20th-century American lawyers
21st-century American businesspeople
African-American business executives
American chief executives
American chief operating officers
American corporate directors
American women business executives
American women chief executives
Brown University alumni
Businesspeople from Greensboro, North Carolina
Chief executives in the media industry
Corporate lawyers
Directors of Twitter, Inc.
Harvard Law School alumni
Harvard Kennedy School alumni
Lawyers from Washington, D.C.
Living people
Marriott International people
People from Columbia, South Carolina
Women corporate directors
Women corporate executives
20th-century American women lawyers
21st-century American businesswomen
20th-century African-American women
20th-century African-American people
21st-century African-American women
21st-century African-American people